Bismuthine (IUPAC name: bismuthane) is the chemical compound with the formula BiH3. As the heaviest analogue of ammonia (a pnictogen hydride), BiH3 is unstable, decomposing to bismuth metal well below 0 °C.  This compound adopts the expected  pyramidal structure with H–Bi–H angles of around 90°.

The term bismuthine may also refer to a member of the family of organobismuth(III) species having the general formula , where R is an organic substituent. For example, Bi(CH3)3 is trimethylbismuthine.

Preparation and properties
BiH3 is prepared by the redistribution of methylbismuthine (BiH2Me):
3 BiH2Me →  2 BiH3  +  BiMe3
The required BiH2Me, which is also thermally unstable, is generated by reduction of methylbismuth dichloride, BiCl2Me with LiAlH4.

As suggested by the behavior of SbH3, BiH3 is unstable and decomposes to its constituent elements according to the following equation:
2 BiH3   →  3 H2  +  2 Bi (ΔH(gas) = −278 kJ/mol)

The methodology used for detection of arsenic ("Marsh test") can also be used to detect BiH3.  This test relies on the thermal decomposition of these trihydrides to the metallic mirrors of reduced As, Sb, and Bi.  These deposits can be further distinguished by their distinctive solubility characteristics: arsenic dissolves in NaOCl, antimony dissolves in ammonium polysulfide, and bismuth resists both reagents.

Uses and safety considerations
The low stability of BiH3 precludes significant health effects, it decomposes rapidly well below room temperature.

References

Bismuth compounds
Metal hydrides